La notte della Repubblica (The Night of the Republic) is a TV programme presented by Sergio Zavoli, broadcast by the Italian public TV channel Rai 2. The programme ran from 12 December 1989 (20th anniversary of Piazza Fontana bombing) to 11 April 1990; the first episode was broadcast on Tuesday, second on Monday, while other episodes were aired every Wednesday evening.

The programme told of Italy during the Years of Lead, with movies, interviews with some protagonists of the period and final discussion.

In 1992 the material broadcast on television was transcribed in the book La notte della Repubblica.

Episodes

References

External links

Italian television shows
1989 Italian television series debuts
1990 Italian television series endings
1980s Italian television series
1990s Italian television series